The 1956 Rice Owls football team represented Rice University during the 1956 NCAA University Division football season. The Owls were led by 17th-year head coach Jess Neely and played their home games at Rice Stadium in Houston, Texas. They competed as members of the Southwest Conference, finishing in sixth.

Schedule

References

Rice
Rice Owls football seasons
Rice Owls football